Copholandrevus is an Australian genus of crickets in the tribe Landrevini.

Taxonomy
The Orthoptera Species File database lists the following species:
Copholandrevus australicus  Chopard, 1925 - type species
Copholandrevus brevicauda  Chopard, 1930

References

Crickets